Robert Henri Marchal (10 November 1901 – 15 July 1961) was a French long-distance runner. He competed in the 10,000 m event at the 1924 and 1928 Summer Olympics and finished 9th and 11th, respectively. In 1924 he was also a non-scoring member of the French 3000 m team that won the bronze medal.

Marchal was also a member of French teams that twice won the International Cross Country Championships between 1924 and 1929. Individually he finished third in 1926 and fourth in 1929.

References

1901 births
1961 deaths
People from Tournan-en-Brie
French male long-distance runners
Athletes (track and field) at the 1924 Summer Olympics
Athletes (track and field) at the 1928 Summer Olympics
Olympic athletes of France
Olympic cross country runners
Sportspeople from Seine-et-Marne